József Horvath (born 3 April 1984) is a Hungarian male hammer thrower, who won an individual gold medal at the Youth World Championships.

References

External links

1984 births
Living people
Hungarian male hammer throwers